The 1950 Harvard Crimson football team was an American football team that represented Harvard University during the 1950 college football season. In their first year under head coach Lloyd Jordan, the Crimson compiled a 1–7 record and were outscored 248 to 74. Philip L. Isenberg was the team captain.

Harvard played its home games at Harvard Stadium in the Allston neighborhood of Boston, Massachusetts.

Schedule

References

Harvard
Harvard Crimson football seasons
Harvard Crimson football
1950s in Boston